Nuray Güngör, née Levent  (born ) is a Turkish weightlifter, who represented Turkey at international competitions.

Born in Bolu, Nuray levent is a native of Düzce, and a member of the ASP Club there. Levent is the only women weightlifter representing Turkey at the 2020 Summer Olympics in Tokyo. Nuray Levent married İsa Gungor in 2021.

Major results
Levent competed at the 2016 European Weightlifting Championships.

Levent competed in the 58 kg division at the 2017 Junior World Weightlifting Championships in Tokyo, Japan, and placed sixth .

She won the bronze medals in snatch, clean&jerk and total of the 64  kg division at the 2019 Junior World Weightlifting Championships held in Suva, Fiji. At  the 2019 European Junior & U23 Weightlifting Championships in Bucharest, Romania, she won the silver medal in the snatch and the bronze medal in clean&jerk, and so took the silver medal in the total of 64 kg division.

At the 2021 European Junior & U23 Weightlifting Championships in Rovaniemi, Finland, she won the gold medal in her event.

She won the gold medal in the women's 64 kg event at the 2022 European Weightlifting Championships held in Tirana, Albania. She won two medals at the 2022 Mediterranean Games held in Oran, Algeria. She won the bronze medal in the women's 71 kg Snatch event and the silver medal in the women's 71 kg Clean & Jerk event.

References

External links
Nuray Levent at TTurkish Olympic Committee website  

2000 births
Living people
Sportspeople from Bolu
Turkish female weightlifters
Place of birth missing (living people)
Competitors at the 2018 Mediterranean Games
Competitors at the 2022 Mediterranean Games
Mediterranean Games gold medalists for Turkey
Mediterranean Games silver medalists for Turkey
Mediterranean Games medalists in weightlifting
Weightlifters at the 2020 Summer Olympics
Olympic weightlifters of Turkey
21st-century Turkish women
Islamic Solidarity Games competitors for Turkey
Islamic Solidarity Games medalists in weightlifting